Alex Cowie (born 11 May 1947) is a British former international squash and tennis player. She competed under her maiden name Alex Soady until 1969.

Initially a tennis player, Cowie made several appearances at Wimbledon in the 1960s and 1970s.

Cowie featured at the World Squash Championships in 1985 and 1987. She was later the coach of Cassie Jackman and served as team manager of the national team.

References

External links
 
 

1947 births
Living people
British female tennis players
English female tennis players
English female squash players